Kolana ligurina is a butterfly in the family Lycaenidae. It was described by William Chapman Hewitson in 1874. It is found in Mexico, Nicaragua and French Guiana.

References

Eumaeini
Butterflies of Central America
Butterflies of North America
Lycaenidae of South America
Lepidoptera of French Guiana
Fauna of the Amazon
Butterflies described in 1874
Taxa named by William Chapman Hewitson